Alessandro Mallamo (born 22 March 1999) is an Italian footballer who plays as a midfielder for  club Bari on loan from Atalanta.

Club career

Atalanta 
Born in Vizzolo Predabissi, Mallamo was a youth exponent of Atalanta.

Loan to Novara 
On 24 August 2018, Mallamo joined to Serie C club Novara on a season-long loan. On 21 October he made his professional debut in Serie C for Novara as a 60th-minute substitute for Matteo Stoppa in a 2–0 away win over Pistoiese. On 3 November he played his first entire match for the team, a 1–1 away draw against Pro Vercelli. On 12 January 2019, Mallamo played as a substitute in the round of 16 of Coppa Italia, a 4–1 away defeat against Lazio. On 1 April he scored his first professional goal in the 47th minute of a 2–1 home defeat against Virtus Entella. Mallamo ended his season-long loan to Novara with 21 appearances, including 12 as a starter, and 1 goal.

Loan to Juve Stabia 
On 11 July 2019, Mallamo was signed by newly promoted Serie B side Juve Stabia on a season-long loan deal. On 1 September he made his Serie B debut for the club in a 2–0 home defeat against Pisa, he played the entire match. Two weeks later. on 14 September, he was sent-off with a double yellow card in the 87th minute of a 0–0 away draw against Perugia. On 13 June 2020, Mallamo scored his first goal for the club in the 3rd minute of a 2–2 away draw against Frosinone and 4 days later, on 17 June, he scored his second goal in the 85th minute of a 3–2 win over Chievo. Mallamo ended his season-long loan to Juve Stabia with 28 appearances and 2 goals, however Juve Stabia was relegated in Serie C.

Loan to Pordenone 
On 4 September 2020, Mallamo was loaned to Serie B club Pordenone on a season-long loan deal. Three weeks later, on 26 September, he made his debut for the club as a starter in a 0–0 away draw against Lecce, he was replaced by Davide Gavazzi in the 76h minute.

Loan to Bari 
On 31 August 2021, he joined Serie C club Bari on loan. On 16 July 2022, the loan was renewed for the 2022–23 season, with Bari now in Serie B.

International career
He was first called up to represent his country in September 2014 for Italy national under-16 football team friendlies.

He participated in the 2016 UEFA European Under-17 Championship, where Under-17 squad did not advance out of group stage.

He made one substitute appearance at the 2018 UEFA European Under-19 Championship, where Under-19 squad finished as runners-up.

Career statistics

Club

Honours

Club 
Bari
 Serie C: 2021–22 (Group C)

International 
Italy U-19
 UEFA European Under-19 Championship runner-up: 2018

References

External links
 

1999 births
Living people
Sportspeople from the Metropolitan City of Milan
Footballers from Lombardy
Italian footballers
Association football midfielders
Serie B players
Serie C players
Atalanta B.C. players
Novara F.C. players
S.S. Juve Stabia players
Pordenone Calcio players
S.S.C. Bari players
Italy youth international footballers